Božilak ('Rainbow') is the sixth studio album by the Macedonian singer Toše Proeski, released in Macedonian. The album comprises fourteen traditional Macedonian songs sung with a new arrangement. It was released in Macedonia by Award and subsequently in Bosnia and Herzegovina, Serbia, Montenegro and Croatia by City Records.

Information about album
With Božilak, Proeski focused on the Macedonian folk music tradition. The album includes popular traditional songs such as "Zajdi, zajdi, jasno sonce", "Majka na Marika dumaše", "More sokol pie", "Ne si go prodavaj Koljo čiflikot" and "So maki sum se rodil". The song "Jovano, Jovanke" was sung in a duet with the Serbian folk singer Biljana Krstić. The music was arranged by the Macedonian composers Soni Petrovski, Saša Nikolovski and Ilija Pejovski. It was first presented during Proeski's concert at the Toše Proeski Arena (then-known as Skopje City Stadium) in Skopje in 2006. On Bravo Show in Serbia, Proeski also performed "Zajdi, zajdi, jasno sonce" in a rock version.

Track listing
Bor sadila moma Evgenija
Se posvrši serbez Donka
Ako odam vo Bitola
Jovano, Jovanke
Ajde slušaj, slušaj, Kaleš bre Anǵo
More sokol pie
Ne si go prodavaj Koljo čiflikot
Si zaljubiv edno mome
Uči me majko, karaj me
So maki sum se rodil
Dejgidi ludi mladi godini
Nažalena nevesta
Zajdi, zajdi, jasno sonce
Majka na Marika dumaše

Release history

Awards
Golden Lady Bug
 The Best Male Singer Of The Year

References

Toše Proeski albums
2006 albums